Lucio Castro is the name of

 Lucio Castro (director) (born 1975), Argentine film director of End of the Century
 Lúcio de Castro (1910–2004), Brazilian pole vaulter